John Aldrich may refer to:

 John Aldrich (political scientist) (born 1947), American political scientist and author
 John Aldrich (MP) (by 1520–1582), English politician
 John Merton Aldrich (1866–1934), American zoologist and entomologist
 John Warren Aldrich (1906–1995), American ornithologist

See also
 John Aldridge (born 1958), Irish football player